St Harmon is a village in Radnorshire, Powys, Wales. The population of the Community at the 2011 census was 593.  It is located on the Afon Marteg on the B4518 road running between Llanidloes and Rhayader. The parish church is called Saint Garmon (Germanus of Auxerre), with many people assuming it has been spelt incorrectly. In fact, the village name of St Harmon is a further Anglicisation of the name St Garmon. St Garmon's Church is known for having the diarist the Reverend Francis Kilvert serve as Vicar there between 1876-1877. It did have its own railway station- St Harmons railway station.

The community includes the settlement of Pantydwr and Nantgwyn.

St Harmon FC is the village football team. The Sun Inn was the village pub but has now been converted to a home.

References

External links 
Photos of St Harmon and surrounding area on geograph

Saint Harmon